Lakhin Wassandasit or Lakhin CP Gym (born 17 April 1972 in Khanom, Nakhon Si Thammarat, Thailand) is a former professional boxer and Muaythai practitioner from Thailand.

Career
Lakhin started Muaythai training at the age of 9, inspired by a fighter from his native province of Nakhon Si Thammarat. He went to Bangkok at the age of 13, staying at the Borkahiwat gym first and then moving to the Por.Chaiwat gym at 17.

In professional boxing, he boxed under Niwat Laosuwannawat's Galaxy Boxing Promotion (same stable as famed Khaosai Galaxy). On May 27, 1995, he had the opportunity to challenge the WBA Bantamweight world champion Daorung Chuvatana a fellow-Thai title holder, in his native Nakhon Si Thammarat. After the 12 rounds, the bout was announced to be a draw despite the criticisms that he was more likely to be the loser.

Titles and accomplishments

Muay Thai
Rajadamnern Stadium
 1991  Rajadamnern Stadium 115 lbs Champion (defended twice)
 1991 Rajadamnern Stadium Fighter of the Year 
 1992 Isuzu Cup Tournament 115 lbs Winner 

Omnoi Stadium 
 2004 Omnoi Stadium 140 lbs Champion 
 2004 Tam Jai Tournament 140 lbs Winner

World Muay Thai Council
 2005 WMC World 140 lbs Champion

Boxing
 PABA Bantamweight Title (1996)
 OPBF Bantamweight Title (1995)

Muay Thai record

|-  style="background:#cfc;"
| 2013-07-21 || Win ||align=left| Nungubon Sitlerchai ||  || Bangkok, Thailand || Decision || 5 || 3:00
|-  style="background:#fbb;"
| 2013-01-21 || Loss ||align=left| Jaroensap Kiatbanchong ||  || Nakhon Si Thammarat, Thailand || Decision || 5 || 3:00
|-  style="background:#cfc;"
| 2005-05-12 || Win ||align=left| Jaroenchai Jor Rachada || Rajadamnern Stadium || Bangkok, Thailand || KO || || 
|-
! style=background:white colspan=9 |
|-  style="background:#fbb;"
| 2004-12-23 || Loss ||align=left| Yodsanklai Fairtex || Daorungchujarean Fights, Rajadamnern Stadium || Bangkok, Thailand || Decision || 5 || 3:00
|-  style="background:#fbb;"
| 2004-07-14 || Loss ||align=left| Yodsanklai Fairtex || Daorungprabath Fights, Rajadamnern Stadium || Bangkok, Thailand || Decision || 5 || 3:00
|-  style="background:#cfc;"
| 2004- ||Win ||align=left| Saiyoknoi Sakchainarong || Omnoi Stadium, Tam Jai Tournament Final || Bangkok, Thailand || KO (Punches) || 2 ||
|-
! style=background:white colspan=9 |
|-  style="background:#cfc;"
| 2004- ||Win ||align=left| Robert Por Cherdkiat || Tam Jai Tournament || Thailand || KO || 3 ||
|-  style="background:#cfc;"
| 2004- ||Win ||align=left| Robert Por Cherdkiat || Tam Jai Tournament || Thailand || KO || 2 ||
|-  style="background:#cfc;"
| 2003-07-02 ||Win ||align=left| Mankong Roylamantaput || Rajadamnern Stadium || Bangkok, Thailand || Decision  || 5 || 3:00
|-  style="background:#cfc;"
| 1993-12-08 ||Win ||align=left| Petcharut || Rajadamnern Stadium || Bangkok, Thailand || Decision  || 5 || 3:00
|-  style="background:#cfc;"
| 1993-08-18 ||Win||align=left| Petchalak Sor Worapin || Rajadamnern Stadium || Bangkok, Thailand || Decision  || 5 || 3:00
|-  style="background:#fbb;"
| 1993-05-19 ||Loss ||align=left| Silapathai Jockygym || Rajadamnern Stadium || Bangkok, Thailand || Decision  || 5 || 3:00
|-  style="background:#fbb;"
| 1993-03-23 ||Loss ||align=left| Jaroensap Kiatbanchong || Rajadamnern Stadium || Bangkok, Thailand || Decision  || 5 || 3:00 
|-
|-  style="background:#cfc;"
| 1993-02-06||Win ||align=left| Dokmaipa Por Pongsawang|| Lumpinee Stadium || Bangkok, Thailand || Decision  || 5 || 3:00
|-  style="background:#cfc;"
| 1993-01-08||Win ||align=left| Dokmaipa Por Pongsawang || Lumpinee Stadium || Bangkok, Thailand || Decision  || 5 || 3:00
|-  style="background:#cfc;"
| 1992-12-05||Win ||align=left| Tukatathong Por Pongsawang|| Lumpinee Stadium || Bangkok, Thailand || Decision  || 5 || 3:00
|-  style="background:#cfc;"
| 1992-11-18 ||Win ||align=left| Wicharn Sitsuchon || Rajadamnern Stadium || Bangkok, Thailand || KO (Right Cross) || 2 ||
|-  style="background:#fbb;"
| 1992-09-28 ||Loss ||align=left| Samson Isaan || Rajadamnern Stadium || Bangkok, Thailand || Decision  || 5 || 3:00 
|-
! style=background:white colspan=9 | 
|-  style="background:#cfc;"
| 1992-08-04 ||Win ||align=left| Samson Isaan || Lumpinee Stadium || Bangkok, Thailand || Decision  || 5 || 3:00
|-  style="background:#cfc;"
| 1992-06-29 ||Win||align=left| Jaroensak Kietnakhonechon || Rajadamnern Stadium || Bangkok, Thailand || Decision  || 5 || 3:00
|-  style="background:#cfc;"
| 1992-06-02 ||Win ||align=left| Chatchainoi Chawraiaoy || Lumpinee Stadium || Bangkok, Thailand || TKO (Doctor Stoppage)|| 4 ||
|-  style="background:#fbb;"
| 1992-04-29 ||Loss ||align=left| Samson Isaan || Rajadamnern Stadium || Bangkok, Thailand || Decision  || 5 || 3:00
|-  style="background:#cfc;"
| 1992-03-19 ||Win ||align=left| Burklerk Pinsinchai || Rajadamnern Stadium, Isuzu Tournament Final|| Bangkok, Thailand || Decision  || 5 || 3:00 
|-
! style=background:white colspan=9 |
|-  style="background:#cfc;"
| 1992-01-23 ||Win ||align=left| Singnoi Sor Prasatporn || Rajadamnern Stadium, Isuzu Tournament Semi Final|| Bangkok, Thailand || Decision  || 5 || 3:00 
|-
! style=background:white colspan=9 |
|-  style="background:#cfc;"
| 1991- ||Win ||align=left| Dennuah Dnemolee || Rajadamnern Stadium, Isuzu Tournament|| Bangkok, Thailand || KO  || 2 || 
|-
! style=background:white colspan=9 |
|-  style="background:#cfc;"
| 1991- ||Win ||align=left| Dejrit Sor.Ploenchit || Rajadamnern Stadium, Isuzu Tournament|| Bangkok, Thailand || KO  || 4 ||
|-  style="background:#cfc;"
| 1991-08-15 ||Win ||align=left| Burklerk Pinsinchai|| Rajadamnern Stadium, Isuzu Tournament|| Bangkok, Thailand || TKO (Punches) || 1 ||
|-  style="background:#cfc;"
| 1991-06-26 || Win ||align=left| Pitilek Chipiphat || Rajadamnern Stadium, Isuzu Tournament|| Bangkok, Thailand || Decision || 5 || 3:00
|-  style="background:#cfc;"
| 1991-05-02 || Win ||align=left| Daoden Sor Sukkasem || Rajadamnern Stadium || Bangkok, Thailand || KO || 3 ||
|-  style="background:#fbb;"
| 1991-04- || Loss ||align=left| Kamron Sor Vorapin|| Rajadamnern Stadium || Bangkok, Thailand || Decision  || 5 || 3:00
|-  style="background:#cfc;"
| 1991-03- || Win ||align=left| Chamnan Saknarin || Rajadamnern Stadium || Bangkok, Thailand || KO || 2 ||
|-  style="background:#fbb;"
| 1991-02-21 || Loss||align=left| Daonapa Ketsamran || Rajadamnern Stadium || Bangkok, Thailand || Decision  || 5 || 3:00
|-  style="background:#fbb;"
| 1991-02- || Loss ||align=left| Singnoi Sor Prasatporn|| Rajadamnern Stadium || Bangkok, Thailand || Decision  || 5 || 3:00
|-  style="background:#cfc;"
| 1991-01- || Win ||align=left| Supernoi Sor Talingchan || Rajadamnern Stadium || Bangkok, Thailand || KO || 4 ||
|-  style="background:#cfc;"
| 1990-11-08 || Win ||align=left| Singnoi Sor Prasatporn|| Rajadamnern Stadium || Bangkok, Thailand || Decision  || 5 || 3:00
|-  style="background:#cfc;"
| 1990-05-16 || Win ||align=left| Manasak Sor Ploenchit|| Rajadamnern Stadium || Bangkok, Thailand || KO || 3 ||
|-  style="background:#fbb;"
| 1990- || Loss ||align=left| Falan Lukprabat|| Rajadamnern Stadium || Bangkok, Thailand || Decision  || 5 || 3:00
|-  style="background:#fbb;"
| 1990- || Loss ||align=left| Kamron Sor Vorapin|| Rajadamnern Stadium || Bangkok, Thailand || Decision  || 5 || 3:00
|-  style="background:#cfc;"
| 1989-09-07 || Win ||align=left| Mahalap Singchatchawan|| Rajadamnern Stadium || Bangkok, Thailand || KO (Punches) ||3 ||
|-  style="background:#fbb;"
| 1989-07-26 ||Loss ||align=left| Mankong Sisomboon|| Rajadamnern Stadium || Bangkok, Thailand || Decision  || 5 || 3:00
|-  style="background:#fbb;"
| 1989-07-08 ||Loss ||align=left| Robert Kaennorasing || Rajadamnern Stadium || Bangkok, Thailand || Decision  || 5 || 3:00
|-  style="background:#cfc;"
| 1989-05-18 || Win ||align=left| Malako Sor Tapsakon|| Rajadamnern Stadium || Bangkok, Thailand || Decision  || 5 || 3:00
|-  style="background:#cfc;"
| 1989-03-23 || Win ||align=left| Kwanmuangnoi Kaengarnpitak || Rajadamnern Stadium || Bangkok, Thailand || Decision  || 5 || 3:00
|-  style="background:#fbb;"
| 1989-02-09 ||Loss ||align=left| Yokpetch Lukprabat || Rajadamnern Stadium || Bangkok, Thailand || Decision  || 5 || 3:00 
|-
! style=background:white colspan=9 |
|-  style="background:#fbb;"
| 1989-01-15 ||Loss ||align=left| Robert Kaennorasing || Crocodile Farm || Samut Prakan, Thailand || Decision  || 5 || 3:00 
|-
|-
| colspan=9 | Legend:

References

External links
 

World boxing champions
1972 births
Living people
Bantamweight boxers
Lakhin Wassandasit
Lakhin Wassandasit
Lakhin Wassandasit